Wilton is a census-designated place (CDP) consisting of the main settlement within the town of Wilton in Franklin County, Maine, United States. The CDP population was 2,198 at the 2010 census, out of a total town population of 4,116.

Geography
The Wilton CDP is located in the south-central part of the town of Wilton at  (44.591961, −70.230456). The CDP extends south to the town line and is bordered by the town of Jay to the south. U.S. Route 2 passes through the southern part of the CDP, bypassing the densely settled town center; US 2 leads northeast  to Farmington and west  to Rumford. Maine State Route 4 runs northeast with US 2 to Farmington but branches off at Wilton, leading south  to the center of Jay. Maine State Route 156 passes through the center of Wilton, leading northwest  to Weld and east  to US 2 beyond Farmington, near the town of New Sharon.

Most of the water area is Wilson Pond, which occupies the western side of the CDP. The pond's outlet, Wilson Stream, descends  in elevation through the CDP, allowing for the development of a few water-powered factories in the 19th century.

Demographics

As of the census of 2000, there were 2,290 people, 958 households, and 614 families residing in the CDP. The racial makeup of the CDP was 96.77% White, 0.66% Black or African American, 0.61% Native American, 1.00% Asian, and 0.96% from two or more races. Hispanic or Latino of any race were 0.48% of the population.

There were 958 households, out of which 30.8% had children under the age of 18 living with them, 48.0% were married couples living together, 12.8% had a female householder with no husband present, and 35.9% were non-families. 28.9% of all households were made up of individuals, and 12.9% had someone living alone who was 65 years of age or older. The average household size was 2.39 and the average family size was 2.91.

In the CDP, the population was spread out, with 26.4% under the age of 18, 8.3% from 18 to 24, 27.3% from 25 to 44, 24.7% from 45 to 64, and 13.3% who were 65 years of age or older. The median age was 38 years. For every 100 females, there were 88.5 males. For every 100 females age 18 and over, there were 85.7 males.

The median income for a household in the CDP was $31,161, and the median income for a family was $40,000. Males had a median income of $32,383 versus $20,714 for females. The per capita income for the CDP was $17,804. About 7.4% of families and 14.6% of the population were below the poverty line, including 20.7% of those under age 18 and 12.8% of those age 65 or over.

References

Census-designated places in Maine
Census-designated places in Franklin County, Maine